The 2019–20 Hapoel Jerusalem B.C. season is the 77th season in the existence of the club. The club will play in the Israeli Premier League. It will also play in the regular season of the Basketball Champions League. 

It will be the second season under head coach Oded Kattash, who was appointed in February 2018.

Players

Squad information

Depth chart

Transactions

In 

|}

Out

References

External links
 Official website

Hapoel Jerusalem B.C.
Hapoel Jerusalem
Hapoel Jerusalem